My Roommate's an Escort is a Canadian comedy web series created, written by, and starring Katie Uhlmann and Trish Rainone. All 11 episodes of the first season are directed by Uhlmann, and the series premiered on YouTube on April 3, 2017. Rainone plays a non-confrontational, small-town girl living in Toronto who suspects her new roommate Kesha, played by Uhlmann, is a call girl.

Background
My Roommate's an Escort was written by Katie Uhlmann and Trish Rainone. Uhlmann and Rainone met at a mutual friend's party and bonded over similar ideas about creating "strong female-driven content." The series went from concept to completion in twelve months.

A preview for the series debuted at the 2017 Toronto Short Film Festival.

Plot
Each episode opens with the same intro, establishing the house where most of the series is set. The same music plays for the intro and outro. Heather, a girl from Sault Ste. Marie, Ontario, now living in Toronto, finds a new roommate online, Kesha, who may or may not be a private escort. Heather passive-aggressively tries to find out more about Kesha, unintentionally getting dragged into her world and the sketchy characters who inhabit it. In each episode, Heather retreats to vent at her one place of solace, a tattoo shop.

Cast
Katie Uhlmann as Kesha
Trish Rainone as Heather 
Bobby Del Rio as Sam
PJ Lazic as Terry
Stephanie Baird as Megan 
Alan Peterson as Golden Jimmy
Jane Luk as Jen
Natasha Bromfield as Susie
Juan Carlos Velis as Bernie
Matthew Willson as Jazz
Angela Asher as Joanne 
Barbara de la Fuente as Ronda
Ellen Dubin as Ginger
David Sparrow as Daddy
John Tench as John Jebovah
Jake Raymond as John
David Emanuel as Ricky
Aisha Evelyna as Kristy
Karlo William as Guillaume

Reception
The Globe and Mail reviewed it positively, describing it as "wry and a bit bonkers" but "endearing and quite funny" and "highly polished for a low-budget production."

Awards and nominations

Awards:

2018 Best International Series – Miami Web Festival – Miami, USA

2017 Best Web/New Media Award – Kapow Intergalactic Film Festival, Los Angeles, USA

2017 Best Actress – Katie Uhlmann – Yes! Let’s Make a Movie Festival, Montreal, Canada

2017 Audience Choice Award – Austin Revolution Film Festival, Austin, USA

2017 Director’s Choice Award – Best Web Series – Austin Revolution Film Festival, Austin, USA

Nominations:

2018 Best Comedy – Vancouver Webfest – Vancouver, Canada

2018 Best Web Series – Miami Web Festival – Miami, USA

2017 Best Actress – Katie Uhlmann – TO Webfest – Toronto, Canada

2017 Best Actress – Trish Rainone – TO Webfest – Toronto, Canada

2017 Best Trailer – Bilbao Web Fest – Bilbao, Spain

References

External links

2017 web series debuts
Canadian comedy web series
YouTube original programming